Eugene Asa Niel Carr (March 20, 1830 – December 2, 1910) was a soldier in the United States Army and a general in the Union Army during the American Civil War. He was awarded the Medal of Honor for his actions at the Battle of Pea Ridge.

Early life
Carr was born in Hamburg, New York. He graduated from the United States Military Academy at West Point, New York, in 1850, 19th in a class of 44 cadets. He was appointed a brevet second lieutenant in the Regiment of Mounted Riflemen and served in the Indian Wars until 1861. On October 3, 1854, Carr first saw combat in the Battle of the Diablo Mountains. By 1861, he had been promoted to captain (June 11, 1858) in the old 1st U.S. Cavalry (later designated the 4th U.S.) and command of Fort Washita in the Indian Territory.

Civil War
During the Civil War, Carr's first combat was at the Battle of Wilson's Creek on August 10, 1861. He was appointed colonel of the 3rd Illinois Cavalry six days later and received a brevet promotion to lieutenant colonel in the regular army.

At the Battle of Pea Ridge in Arkansas, on March 7, 1862, Carr led the 4th Division of the Army of the Southwest in the fighting around Elkhorn Tavern.  He was wounded in the neck, arm, and ankle and was later awarded a Medal of Honor for his actions. According to the official citation, Carr had "directed the deployment of his command and held his ground, under a brisk fire of shot and shell in which he was several times wounded." On April 30, 1862, President Abraham Lincoln appointed Carr brigadier general of volunteers, to rank from March 7, 1862. The President had submitted the nomination to the U.S. Senate on April 11, 1862, and the Senate had confirmed the appointment on April 28, 1862 Carr briefly commanded the Army of the Southwest from October 7 to November 12, 1863.  He commanded the 2nd Division of the Army of Southeast Missouri before he and his division were transferred to the Army of the Tennessee as the 14th Division in the XIII Corps.

During the Vicksburg Campaign, Carr led the attack on Confederate forces at the Battle of Port Gibson.  He fought in subsequent battles at Champion's Hill and Vicksburg.  After the fall of Vicksburg, Carr was transferred back to Arkansas where he was placed in command of a division in the Army of Arkansas.  Eventually, Carr commanded the Cavalry Division in the VII Corps during Frederick Steele's Camden Expedition.  For the rest of 1864, he commanded the District of Little Rock.  His final assignment of the war was to command of the 3rd Division of the XVI Corps in preparation for the Union campaign against Mobile, Alabama, where he subsequently fought in the Battle of Fort Blakely. On March 11, 1865, President Lincoln nominated and the U.S. Senate confirmed Carr for appointment to the brevet grade of major general of volunteers to rank from March 11, 1865. Carr was mustered out of the volunteers on January 15, 1866. On July 17, 1866, President Andrew Johnson nominated Carr for appointment to the brevet grade of major general, USA (regular army), to rank from March 13, 1865, and the U.S. Senate confirmed the appointment on July 23, 1866.

Postbellum service
Subsequently, Carr stayed in the Regular Army and conducted successful operations on the frontier against the Indians, winning a significant battle at Summit Springs. He became Colonel of the 6th Cavalry Regiment in 1879; and Brigadier General in 1892. He was in command at the incident at Cibecue Creek with the Apache in 1881.  He was the last commander of the District of New Mexico from November 26, 1888, to September 1, 1890.

Carr finally retired in 1893. His military nickname was "The Black-Bearded Cossack". Carr died in Washington, D.C. in 1910 and is buried in the West Point Cemetery, New York.

Medal of Honor citation
Rank and organization: Colonel, 3d Illinois Cavalry. Place and date: At Pea Ridge, Ark., March 7, 1862. Entered service at: Hamburg, Erie County, N.Y. Born: March 10, 1830, Boston Corner, Erie County, N.Y. Date of issue: January 16, 1894.

Citation:

Directed the deployment of his command and held his ground, under a brisk fire of shot and shell in which he was several times wounded.

See also

List of Medal of Honor recipients
List of American Civil War Medal of Honor recipients: A–F
List of American Civil War generals (Union)

Notes

References

 Eicher, John H., and Eicher, David J., Civil War High Commands, Stanford University Press, 2001, .
 Warner, Ezra J., Generals in Blue: Lives of the Union Commanders, Louisiana State University Press, 1964, .

Leighton, David, ″Gen. Eugene Asa Carr was NY-born Union officer, Indian fighter″, Arizona Daily Star, July 31, 2012.

External links
 
 

1830 births
1910 deaths
People from Hamburg, New York
People of New York (state) in the American Civil War
Union Army generals
United States Army Medal of Honor recipients
United States Military Academy alumni
Comanche campaign
Burials at West Point Cemetery
Apache Wars
American Civil War recipients of the Medal of Honor
Pine Ridge Campaign